Sirens is an unreleased demo album by American singer-songwriter Lana Del Rey, under the pseudonym May Jailer. It was recorded in 2006, making it her earliest full-length album. The entire project was leaked through YouTube on May 31, 2012.

The album leaked during the Born to Die era, during which many of Del Rey's unreleased songs surfaced. It's unclear how the songs were leaked, although some leakers claim they were stolen from Lana's laptop after she connected to an insecure wifi network. These rumors have not been confirmed or denied by Del Rey.

Composition 
Composed entirely of acoustic tracks, the album is devoid of the hip hop beats, electronic tones, and experimental music found on Born to Die. The vocals are "granola-style". Most of the album's songs have the same tempo.

Critical reception 
Idolator likened the Jailer album to Jewel's debut, Pieces of You. Further, Idolator said: "Though her vocals are often weak and shaky, her tone sounds delicate and sweet on all these simple tracks...[The] songs [are] written in her range, so she doesn't have to sing (and sing-talk) in her head voice and resort to that cutesy, flirty baby coo so prominent throughout Born To Die." Pop Crush reviewer Amy Sciarretto said she could imagine Del Rey singing the album's tracks in a coffeehouse. Calling the tracks themselves "folky and fragile", Further, Sciarretto compared Del Rey's voice to that of a "little bird", saying it was no wonder that songs called "Birds of a Feather" and "Aviation" appeared on the album.

Track listing

References 

Demo albums
Folk albums by American artists
Lana Del Rey albums
Unreleased albums